"Nowhere girls" or "Mei Nu" is a neologism coined to describe women who have no money, no job, no education, no prospects, no looks, no friends and no sophistication. The pinyin and pronunciation of "nowhere girls" is the same as that of "beautiful girls" in Putonghua.

The term is used to characterise those women who refuse to conform to male expectations and are therefore thought to be unattractive by men, and has strong pejorative connotations. A calque of a South Korean term, it spread to Hong Kong via China, and became popularised through its use in a reality show called Nowhere Girls, which was broadcast by Television Broadcasts Limited. This show has aroused much public discussion on this topic.

Description
In the TV programme Nowhere Girls, women are called "nowhere girls" because they are lazy, selfish, short-tempered, rude to others, unfashionable and self-deluded.

Characteristics
Don't conform to traditional expectations of beauty  
Unemployed or have low income
Lack social competence
Tend to escape reality
Self-centered, deny any problems of themselves
Emotional or short-tempered
Dependent

Causes

Family
As nowhere girls experience distinct family affairs, leaving them psychologically hurt. Moreover, Hong Kong has low birth rates from time to time, leading to single-child families. They become the treasure of their parents. They are pampered and spoiled, which results in weakened coping abilities. In addition, children nowadays engage in less communication with their parents who are always out for work, and thus children receive less parental mental support.

Societal
Nowhere girls do not conform to traditional notions of beauty. In addition, they are self-centered and short-tempered. It is difficult for them to engage in the society with appropriate communication and to cooperate with others. As they are spoiled by their parents, they lack essential skills like problem-solving skills. Therefore, they do not appeal to employers and thus cannot find a job, while they insist that it is a social discrimination.

Effects

Low self-esteem
Nowhere girls become less confident and inferior in front of their friends and families because they are not appreciated. For instance, the participants in the Nowhere Girls show cried frequently in front of the camera. They were being teased in the cyber world. in which their background informations were being disclosed in the public. In severe cases, they may suffer from depression or psychological illnesses.

Socially withdrawn
Nowhere girls are less willing to engage in social activities. They prefer being alone instead of participating in social gatherings to avoid any embarrassment. They have low sense of connection with their social circles. Moreover, they may undergo difficulties in meeting new friends as they are not being recognised.

High family pressure
Most of the nowhere girls are either single or unmarried. Their parents will be anxious about their marital status as Chinese people values marriage. They will be pressurised to find their partners as soon as possible. This brings them great pressure in fulfilling their parents' expectations, and also deteriorates their family relationships.

Pessimistic attitude towards life
Nowhere girls hold negative attitudes towards their futures. They perceive their life as unfortunate. Therefore, they always think pessimistically since they consider their lives as hopeless. Lacking of security in their family will further result in their inclination into pessimism.

Media

TV programme

Nowhere Girls is a reality show produced by Television Broadcasts Limited. It was broadcast in August 2014 and there are 20 episodes in total. The show focuses on seven women who are described as "have nots" and each of them is said to represent one of "seven deadly sins", including laziness, selfishness, ugliness and being a recent mainland immigrant etc. This programme stirred up much controversy since it discriminated against so-called "Mei Nu" and brought out wrong messages – "makeovers, working with fitness trainers and life coaches can lead to better lives" to the audience.

There were also suspicions that seven women got paid to act and some incidents were staged. Moreover, the show hurt the professional image of psychologists in Hong Kong because Wong Hoi-man, who is a clinical psychologist and the guest counsellor of Nowhere Girls, handled cases in improper ways. It led to misunderstandings towards therapeutic techniques of qualified psychologists.

See also 
 Chinese ideals of female beauty

References

Culture-bound syndromes
Culture of Hong Kong
Taiwanese culture
Chinese culture
South Korean culture
Pejorative terms for women
Stereotypes
Women in Hong Kong
Women in China